The Dominican ambassador in Washington, D. C. is the official representative of the Government in Roseau to the Government of the United States.

List of representatives

See also
Dominica–United States relations

References 

 
United States
Dominica